Clarence William 'Clarrie' Tupper (1908-1985) was an Australian rugby league footballer who played in the 1930s.

Playing career
Clarrie Tupper played three seasons with Newtown between 1933 and 1936. A front row forward, formerly from St. George rugby, Tupper won a premiership with Newtown, playing in the 1933 Grand Final winning team.

After being banned during 1935 due to the residential qualification rules of the time, Tupper refused the NSWRFL request that he transfer to the new Canterbury-Bankstown rugby league team. Tupper refused to leave Newtown and sat out the 1935 season, and although he was still listed at Newtown for 1936, he didn't play rugby league again.

Death
Tupper died on 26 December 1985 aged 77.

References

Newtown Jets players
Australian rugby league players
1908 births
1985 deaths
Rugby league props